Charly Steinberger (1937–2019) was an Austrian cinematographer. He also directed one film, the 1975 comedy Monika and the Sixteen Year Olds. He was married to the actress Susanne Uhlen.

Selected filmography
 Deep End (1970)
 Love Is Only a Word (1971)
 Und Jimmy ging zum Regenbogen (1971)
 The Stuff That Dreams Are Made Of (1972)
 King, Queen, Knave (1972)
 All People Will Be Brothers (1973)
 One or the Other of Us (1974)
 Three Men in the Snow (1974)
 Monika and the Sixteen Year Olds (1975)
 To the Bitter End (1975)
 The Net (1975)
 Crime After School (1975)
 Rosemary's Daughter (1976)
 Women in Hospital (1977)
 Just a Gigolo (1978)
 The Man in the Rushes (1978)
 The Lightship (1985)
 Fire, Ice and Dynamite (1990)

References

Bibliography
 Terri Ginsberg & Andrea Mensch. A Companion to German Cinema. John Wiley & Sons, 2012.

External links

1937 births
2019 deaths
Austrian cinematographers
People from Braunau am Inn